Archbishop Basil Volodymyr Ladyka, O.S.B.M. (2 August 1884 in Drohobych, Austro-Hungarian Empire (present day Lviv Oblast, Ukraine) – 1 September 1956 in Winnipeg, Canada) was a Ukrainian-born Canadian Ukrainian Greek Catholic hierarch. He served as the Head of the Ukrainian Greek-Catholic Church in Canada from 20 May 1929 until his death on 1 September 1956. He had the next titles: Apostolic Exarch of Canada from 20 May 1929 until 19 January 1948, Apostolic Exarch of Central Canada from 19 January 1948 until 10 March 1951; and Apostolic Exarch of Manitoba from 10 March 1951 until 1 September 1956.

Life
Archbishop Ladyka was born in the family of Vasyl and Kateryna (née Plyauschak) Ladyka in Halychyna. After the school and gymnasium education, he subsequently joined the Order of Saint Basil the Great in 1903, where he made a profession on April 2, 1905 and a solemn profession on August 28, 1909. Ladyka was ordained as a priest on August 4, 1912, after completed philosophical and theological studies in Montreal, Quebec,  Canada, where he lived in the Basilian community from 1909.

After his ordination Fr. Ladyka worked as a missionary in Canada and from 1922 until 1929 served as Hegumen of the monastery in Edmonton.

On May 20, 1929, Fr. Ladyka was nominated by Pope Pius XI and on July 14, 1929 consecrated to the Episcopate as the Titular Bishop of Abydos and the second Apostolic Exarch of Canada. The principal consecrator was Bishop Constantine Bohachevsky.

On June 21, 1948, he was elevated in rank of archbishop with title of the Titular See of Martyropolis. Archbishop Ladyka was a founder of the different Ukrainian associations in Canada and died on September 1, 1956 in the age 72.

References

External links
Necrology at Svoboda (newspaper) 

1884 births
1956 deaths
People from Drohobych
People from the Kingdom of Galicia and Lodomeria
Ukrainian Austro-Hungarians
Ukrainian emigrants to Canada
Canadian bishops
Canadian Eastern Catholics
Naturalized citizens of Canada
20th-century Eastern Catholic bishops
Bishops of the Ukrainian Greek Catholic Church
Canadian members of the Ukrainian Greek Catholic Church
Order of Saint Basil the Great